A roadside memorial is a marker that usually commemorates a site where a person died suddenly and unexpectedly, away from home. Unlike a grave site headstone, which marks where a body is laid, the memorial marks the last place on earth where a person was alive – although in the past travelers were, out of necessity, often buried where they fell.

Usually the memorial is created and maintained by family members or friends of the person who died. A common type of memorial is simply a bunch of flowers, real or plastic, taped to street furniture or a tree trunk. A handwritten message, personal mementos, etc. may be included. More sophisticated memorials may be a memorial cross, ghost bike, ghost shoes, or a plaque with an inscription, decorated with flowers or wreaths.

Roadside memorials tend to be clustered along the busiest roadways and often at intersections.

Meaning and message

Roadside memorials are a statement of grief and love from the loved ones of the accident victim or victims.

But apart from their personal significance, these memorials also serve as a reminder and warning to other road users of the dangers of driving, and to encourage safer driving. In the 1940s and 1950s, the Arizona Highway Patrol began using white crosses to mark the site of fatal car accidents. This practice was continued by families of road-crash victims after it had been abandoned by the police. The ghost bike phenomenon, where an old bicycle is painted white and locked up at an accident site, serves the same purpose in relation to cycling casualties.

Historically, roadside memorials were personal memorials, but there is a modern trend toward public memorials of increasingly large size. Typically little or no effort is made to make the memorials accommodate the natural beauty of the landscape and many roadside memorials, over time, lack proper maintenance.

The phenomenon of roadside memorials may be associated with another growing trend: public outpouring of grief for celebrities. The death of Diana, Princess of Wales, for example, precipitated an avalanche of flowers and wreaths at the Pont de l'Alma road tunnel in Paris, the site of her death, and at Kensington Palace, her home in London. 

While car-crash victims are rarely so well known, something of the same sort of impulse to make a public display of emotion at the site of a tragedy may be partly responsible for the growing popularity of roadside memorials. The broad phenomenon of creating improvised and temporary memorials after traumatic death (accidents, murder, disasters etc.) has become popular since the 1980s. Because of their non-institutionalized character they are generically coined as grassroots memorials.

History and practice
Roadside memorials have been erected around the world for centuries. Their legality varies from country to country.

Australia
The number of memorials erected in Australia since 1990 has increased considerably. In 2003, it was estimated that one in five road deaths were  memorialized at the site of the crash.

Ukraine

It is traditional in Ukraine to place a roadside memorial on the site of a deadly car or motorcycle crash. It is usually a cross or a small monument with a wreath of flowers. There are also usually fresh flowers regularly placed by the cross if the relatives of the person who died live close enough to look after the memorial. Sometimes Ukrainian roadside memorials can be more elaborate, including a small granite or marble gravestone and/or a picture of the loved one.

United Kingdom

In the United Kingdom, the practice of erecting roadside memorials has recently generated a media debate about the danger these memorials may pose to other road users and to people erecting them in unsafe places. This debate has been sparked by accounts of dangerous actions, such as when an adult crosses a main road with a child to place a tribute. Some jurisdictions already enforce local regulations, and police officials and local councilors have suggested that uniform rules be introduced across the country. For example, according to the BBC, in Merthyr Tydfil, memorials will only be allowed where it is deemed safe and appropriate, and they will be removed after three months.

United States

The spread  of spontaneous roadside memorials to mark the site of fatal traffic accidents in the United States is a relatively new phenomenon. There is a gravestone-style memorial in Ellington, Connecticut marking a child's death in 1812.  A typical memorial includes a cross (usually wooden), flowers, hand-painted signs, and, in the case of a child's death, stuffed animals.

The origin of roadside crosses in the United States has its roots with the early Mexican settlers of the south-western United States, and are common in areas with large Hispanic populations. Formerly, in funerary processions where a group would proceed from a church to a graveyard carrying a coffin, the bearers would take a rest, or descanso in Spanish, and wherever they set the coffin down, a cross would be placed there in memory of the event. The modern practice of roadside shrines commemorate the last place a person was alive before receiving fatal injuries, even if they should actually die in a hospital after the crash.

In the southwestern United States, they are also common at historic parajes on old long distance trails, going back to the roots of the tradition, and also marked the graves of people who died while traveling. A descanso memorial may be decorated especially for the holidays, and for significant anniversaries in the person's life.  A descanso memorial for a child may be decorated with special toys, even toy vignettes of family life, and votive candles may be placed there on special nights.

In the United States, the legal situation varies from state to state.

In New Mexico, Department of Transportation crews undertaking new construction are not required to protect them, but usually either avoid altering them, or otherwise place them as close to where they originally were as possible once construction has been completed as a courtesy.

In California, Streets and Highways Code Section 101.10 directs the California Department of Transportation (Caltrans) to place and maintain memorial signs along state highways that read “Please Don't Drink and Drive” followed by “In Memory of {victim's name}.” Caltrans places signs at the request of victims’ relatives when there is a fatality as a result of an alcohol or drug-impaired driver. The signs are to remain in place for a period of seven years. The department shall charge the requesting party a fee to cover the department’s cost in designing, constructing, placing, and maintaining that sign, and the department’s costs in administering this section.

South Dakotan THINK Signs are used for a similar purpose in the state of South Dakota. These signs mark the site of a fatal road accident anywhere in the state. Approximately half of all signs are in place due to drunk driving.
The signs read either "THINK!" or "WHY DIE?" and feature a prominent red X and a black and white backdrop. 

The states of Colorado, Massachusetts, Kentucky, and Wisconsin ban such memorials.

In the state of Delaware, roadside memorials are illegal per the Clear Zone Act for safety reasons. As an alternative to roadside memorials, the Delaware Highway Memorial Garden located at the Smyrna Rest Area consists of a path with bricks bearing the names of people who died along roads in Delaware. Other states impose specific requirements for roadside memorials.

In Birmingham, Alabama, roadside memorials have been removed from Interstate highways. Some people view unauthorized street memorials as illegal and think they constitute the taking of public property for private purposes, and are also a distraction and therefore dangerous to the motoring public.  Others think they serve as a sort of public service announcement that reminds drivers to be careful and drive safely, and are no more distracting than any other roadside advertisement.  For anyone but those close to the death, they may do little but clutter the landscape. If the memorial is located on a road that the loved ones seldom or never travel, or in a remote area, it may be seen as a form of grandstanding.

Using a Christian cross as a memorial along a public highway can be seen as an illegal endorsement of religion and has been challenged in a growing number of lawsuits by secular groups concerned about the separation of church and state.  On 18 August 2010 the Tenth Circuit held that the State of Utah violated the Establishment Clause of the Constitution by constructing a series of 12-foot high Latin crosses along the roadside to memorialize fallen state troopers.  In Lake Elsinore California, a personal roadside cross was removed following a complaint by the American Humanist Association.  

In the state of Virginia, family-made temporary memorials of whatever shape and construction may be replaced by a state-issue memorial roadsign saying "DRIVE SAFELY IN MEMORY OF" with a name plate; such signs avoid the state-religious-endorsement controversy by only using a generic circle as an emblem.

See also
 Parting stone

References

External links

 Flowers of loss the roadside tributes that provide a haunting reminder of our own mortality The Independent
 Definition of "descanso" from Doubletongued.org
 Information and Photos of Roadside Memorials in the United States
 United States National Registry of Highway and Roadside Memorials
 Australian National Registry of Highway and Roadside Memorials
 Australian Broadcasting Commission transcript of White lines, White Crosses, broadcast 7 December 2003
 Further information and pictures accompanying  the story White Lines, White Crosses
 Photos and information about roadside memorials throughout Florida. Includes links to every state memorial marker programs.
 Pictorial of Roadside Memorials throughout So. Florida
 Roadside Memorials of South Texas
 Roadside Memorials of France
 Roadside Crossings
  WashingtonPost article on roadside memorials in Washington DC
 Zarrilli, Tom. "Crosses, Flowers, and Asphalt: Roadside Memorials in the U.S. South," Southern Spaces 19 August 2009.

Burial monuments and structures
Automotive safety
Death customs
Traffic collisions
Street furniture
Types of monuments and memorials